Arthropods are invertebrate animals having an exoskeleton, a segmented body, and paired jointed appendages. Arthropods form the phylum Arthropoda. They are distinguished by their jointed limbs and cuticle made of chitin, often mineralised with calcium carbonate. The arthropod body plan consists of segments, each with a pair of appendages. Arthropods are bilaterally symmetrical and their body possesses an external skeleton. In order to keep growing, they must go through stages of moulting, a process by which they shed their exoskeleton to reveal a new one. Some species have wings. They are an extremely diverse group, with up to 10 million species.

Arthropods are invertebrate animals with a chitinous exoskeleton, segmented bodies, and jointed legs.  The phylum Arthropoda contains numerous taxonomic orders in over 20 classes.

Subphylum Hexapoda

Class Insecta (Insects)

Subclass Monocondylia or monochlamydia 
 Order †Monura
 Order Archaeognatha – 350 (Jumping bristletails)

Subclass Dicondylia 
 Order †Carbotriplurida
 Infraclass Thysanura
 Order Zygentoma – 370
 Infraclass Pterygota
 Order †Reculida
 Order †Perielytrodea
 Order †Eoblattida
 Clade Panephemeroptera
 Order †Protephemeroptera
 Order †Syntonopterodea
 Order †Permoplectoptera
 Order †Coxoplectoptera
 Order Ephemeroptera – 3,000 (Mayflies)
 Clade Odonataptera
 Order †Eugeroptera
 Order †Kukaloptera
 Order †Argentinoptera
 Order †Geroptera
 Order †Eomeganisoptera
 Order †Meganisoptera
 Order †Campylopterodea
 Order †Protanisoptera
 Order †Triadophlebioptera
 Order †Protozygoptera
 Order Odonata – 5,900 (Dragonflies and damselflies)
 Clade Palaeodictyopteroidea
 Order †Palaeodictyoptera
 Order †Archodonata
 Order †Diaphanopterodea
 Order †Megasecoptera
 Clade Polyneoptera
 Order †Paoliida
 Order †Protorthoptera (Paraphyletic assemblage of basal and stem polyneopterans)
 Order †Sheimiodea
 Order Zoraptera – 28 (Angel insects)
 Order †Archelytroidea
 Order †Protelytroptera
 Order Dermaptera – 1,816 (Earwigs)
 Order Plecoptera – 2,274 (Stoneflies)
 Order †Caloblattinidea
 Order †Alienoptera
 Order Mantodea – 2,200 (Mantises)
 Order Blattodea – 3,684–4,000 (Cockroaches and termites)
 Order Notoptera – 30 (Includes icebugs)
 Order Phasmatodea – 2,500–3,300 (Stick insects or stick-bugs)
 Order Embioptera – 200–300 (Webspinners)
 Order †Chresmododea
 Order †Cnemidolestida
 Order †Titanoptera
 Order †Caloneurodea
 Order Orthoptera – 24,380 (Grasshoppers, locusts, crickets, etc.)
 Clade Clareocercaria
 Order †Hypoperlida
 Order †Miomoptera
 Order Psocodea – 11,000 (Lice, bark lice, book lice)
 Order †Permopsocida
 Order Hemiptera – 50,000–80,000 (True bugs)
 Order †Lophioneurida
 Order Thysanoptera – 5,000 (Thrips)
 Clade Holometabola
 Order Hymenoptera – 115,000 (Sawflies, wasps, bees, and ants)
 Order Strepsiptera – 596 (Twisted-wing parasites)
 Order Coleoptera – 360,000–400,000 (Beetles)
 Order †Glosselytrodea
 Order Raphidioptera – 210 (Snakeflies)
 Order Megaloptera – 250–300 (Alderflies, dobsonflies, and fishflies)
 Order Neuroptera – 5,000 (Net-winged insects)
 Order †Protomecoptera
 Order †Tarachoptera
 Order †Permotrichoptera
 Order Lepidoptera – 174,250 (Butterflies and moths)
 Order Trichoptera – 12,627 (Caddisfly)
 Order †Paratrichoptera
 Order †Protodiptera (Permotipula and Permila)
 Order Diptera – 152,956 (Flies)
 Order †Paramecoptera
 Order Nannomecoptera
 Order Mecoptera – 481 (Scorpionflies)
 Order Neomecoptera
 Order Siphonaptera – 2,525 (Fleas)

Class Entognatha 

 Order Collembola (Springtails)
 Order Diplura (Diplurans)
 Order Protura (Coneheads)

Subphylum Chelicerata

Class Xiphosura 
 Order Xiphosurida

Class †Eurypterida 
 Order †Eurypterida
 Order †Chasmataspidida

Class Arachnida (Arachnids) 

 Subclass Acari (Mites)
 Order Opilioacariformes
 Order Ixodida (Ticks)
 Order Holothyrida
 Order Mesostigmata
 Order Trombidiformes
 Order Oribatida (Beetle mites)
 Order Endeostigmata
 Subclass Megoperculata
 Order Amblypygi (Whip spiders)
 Order Araneae (Spiders)
 Order †Haptopoda
 Order Palpigradi (Microwhip scorpions)
 Order †Uraraneida 
 Order Ricinulei (Hooded tickspiders)
 Order Schizomida (Short-tailed whip scorpions)
 Order Uropygi (Thelyphonida s.s., whip scorpions)
 Order †Trigonotarbida
 Subclass Dromopoda
 Order Opiliones (Harvestmen, also known as daddy longlegs)
 Order †Phalangiotarbida
 Order Pseudoscorpionida (Pseudoscorpions, or false scorpions)
 Order Scorpiones (True scorpions)
 Order Solifugae (Sun spiders or wind scorpions)

Class Pycnogonida 
 Order Pantopoda (Sea spiders)

Subphylum Myriapoda (Centipedes and millipedes)

Class Chilopoda (Centipedes)
 Order Scutigeromorpha
 Order Lithobiomorpha (stone centipedes)
 Order †Devonobiomorpha
 Order Craterostigmomorpha
 Order Scolopendromorpha (tropical centipedes)
 Order Geophilomorpha (soil centipedes)

Class Diplopoda (Millipedes)

Subclass Penicillata
 Order Polyxenida (Bristly millipedes)

Subclass Chilognatha
 Order †Zosterogrammida
 Infraclasss †Arthropleuridea
 Order †Arthropleurida
 Order †Eoarthropleurida 
 Order †Microdecemplicida
 Infraclass Pentazonia
 Order †Amynilyspedida 
 Superorder Limacomorpha 
 Order Glomeridesmida 
 Superorder Oniscomorpha (Pill millipedes)
 Order Glomerida 
 Order Sphaerotheriida (Giant pill millipedes)
 Infraclasss †Archipolypoda 
 Order †Archidesmida 
 Order †Cowiedesmida
 Order †Euphoberiida 
 Order †Palaeosomatida 
 Infraclass Helminthomorpha
 Order †Pleurojulida 
 Order Platydesmida 
 Order Polyzoniida  
 Order Siphonocryptida 
 Order Siphonophorida  
 Superorder Juliformia
 Order Julida 
 Order Siphoniulida
 Order Spirobolida 
 Order Spirostreptida 
 Superfamily †Xyloiuloidea (Sometimes aligned with Spirobolida) 
 Superorder Merocheta
 Order Polydesmida (Flat-backed millipedes)
 Superorder Nematophora  
 Order Callipodida 
 Order Chordeumatida 
 Order Stemmiulida

Class Pauropoda

 Order Hexamerocerata
 Order Tetramerocerata

Class Symphyla  
 Order Scolopendrellida (garden centipedes)
 Order Scutigerellida

Subphylum Crustacea (Crustaceans) 
 Order †Agnostina
 Order †Henningsmoenicarida
 Order †Cambropachycopida
 Order †Cambrocarida
 Order †Martinssoniida
 Order †Phosphatocopida
 Order †Bostrichopodida

Class †Thylacocephala 
 Order †Ainiktozoiformes
 Order †Concavicarida
 Order †Conchyliocarida

Class Remipedia
 Order †Enantiopoda
 Order Nectiopoda

Class Branchiopoda

 Subclass Sarsostraca 
 Order Anostraca (Fairy shrimp)
 Order †Lipostraca
 Subclass Phyllopoda 
 Infraclass Calmanostraca 
 Order †Protocaridida
 Order †Kazacharthra
 Order Notostraca (Tadpole shrimp)
 Infraclass Diplostraca (Clam shrimp)
 Order Laevicaudata
 Order Spinicaudata
 Order Cyclestherida
 Order Cladocera (Water fleas)

Class Cephalocarida 
 Order Brachypoda (Horseshoe shrimp)

Class Thecostraca

Subclass Ascothoracida
 Order Dendrogastrida
 Order Laurida

Subclass Cirripedia (Barnacles)
 Infraclass Acrothoracica
 Order Cryptophialida
 Order Lithoglyptida
 Infraclass Rhizocephala
 Infraclass Thoracica
 Superorder Phosphatothoracica
 Order Iblomorpha
 Order †Eolepadomorpha
 Superorder Thoracicalcarea
 Order Calanticomorpha
 Order Pollicipedomorpha
 Order Scalpellomorpha
 Order †Archaeolepadomorpha
 Order †Brachylepadomorpha
 (unranked) Sessilia (Acorn barnacles)
 Order Balanomorpha
 Order Verrucomorpha

Subclass Facetotecta

Class Hexanauplia

Subclass Copepoda (Copepods)

 Infraclass Progymnoplea 
 Order Platycopioida
 Infraclass Neocopepoda
 Clade Gymnoplea
 Order Calanoida
 Clade Podoplea
 Order Canuelloida
 Order Cyclopoida (incl. Poecilostomatoida)
 Order Gelyelloida
 Order Harpacticoida
 Order Misophrioida
 Order Monstrilloida
 Order Mormonilloida
 Order Siphonostomatoida

Class Branchiura
 Order Arguloida (Carp lice, or fish lice)
 Order †Cyclida (Cycloids)

Class  Pentastomida (Tongue worms) 

 Order Cephalobaenida
 Order Porocephalida
 Order Raillietiellida
 Order Reighardiida

Class Mystacocarida

 Order Mystacocaridida

Class Ostracoda (Ostracods, or seed shrimp)

 Order †Eridostracoda

Subclass †Leperditicopa
 Order †Leperditicopida
 Order thippslicus

Subclass †Leiocopa
 Order †Leiocopida

Subclass †Palaeocopa
 Order †Palaeocopida

Subclass Myodocopa
 Order Myodocopida
 Order Halocyprida

Subclass Podocopa
 Order Platycopida 
 Order Podocopida

Class Malacostraca (Malcostracans, such as crabs and lobsters)

Subclass Eumalacostraca
 Superorder Syncarida
 Order Anaspidacea Calman, 1904
 Order Bathynellacea Chappuis, 1915
 Order †Palaeocaridacea
 Superorder †Eocarida
 Order †Eocaridacea
 Order †Pygocephalomorpha
 Superorder Peracarida
 Order Amphipoda (Includes freshwater shrimp and sandhoppers) 
 Order Cumacea (Hooded shrimp) 
 Order Isopoda (Isopods - includes wood lice)
 Order Lophogastrida 
 Order Mictacea 
 Order Mysida 
 Order Spelaeogriphacea 
 Order Stygiomysida 
 Order Tanaidacea (Tanaids) 
 Order Thermosbaenacea
 Superorder Eucarida
 Order Decapoda (Crayfish, crabs, lobsters, prawns, and shrimp) 
 Order Euphausiacea (Krill)
 Order †Angustidontida

Subclass Hoplocarida
 Order Stomatopoda (Mantis shrimp)
 Order †Aeschronectida 
 Order †Palaeostomatopoda

Subclass Phyllocarida
 Order ?†Discinocarida
 Order †Archaeostraca
 Order †Hoplostraca
 Order Leptostraca

Subphylum †Artiopoda

no class 
 Order †Emeraldellida
 Order †Cheloniellida
 Order †Sidneyiformes

Class †Protosutura 
 Order †Acanthomeridiida

Class †Aglaspida 
 Order †Aglaspidida
 Order †Strabopida

Class †Trilobita

Order Retifaciida

Subclass †Petalopleura 
 Order †Sinoburiida
 Order †Xandarellida

Subclass †Nectopleura
 Order †Nectaspidida

Subclass †Conciliterga
 Order †Helmetiida †

Subclass †Trilobita
 Order †Eodiscina
 Order †Olenellina
 Order †Asaphida
 Order †Aulacopleurida
 Order †Corynexochida
 Order †Harpetida
 Order †Redlichiida
 Order †Lichida
 Order †Phacopida
 Order †Proetida
 Order †Ptychopariida

Other classes

no class 
 Order †Isoxyida
 Order †Odaraiida
 Order †Pectocaridida 
 Order †Mollisoniida 
 Order †Bradoriida
 Order †Burgessiida

Class† Paracrustacea 
 Order †Canadaspidida

Class †Yunnanata 
 Order †Fuxianhuiida

Class †Megacheira 

 Order †Fortiforcipida
 Order †Leanchoiliida
 Order †Yohoiida

Class †Sanctacaridea 
 Order †Habeliida
 Order †Sanctacarida

Class †Marrellomorpha 
 Order †Acercostraca
 Order †Marrellida
 Order †Mimetasterida

Class †Dinocaridida 
 Order †Radiodonta
 Order †Anomalocarididae
 Order †Opabiniida

Class †Euthycarcinoidea 
 Order †Euthycarcinida

References 
 

Orders